Jarosław Szarek (born 1963) is a Polish journalist, writer and historian. Employee of the Bureau of Public Education of the Institute of National Remembrance (IPN). He specializes in the recent communist-era history of Poland.

Szarek was appointed as president of the IPN on 22 July 2016, and was succeeded on 23 July 2021 by Karol Nawrocki.

Selected works
 Czy ktoś przebije ten mur? Sprawa Stanisława Pyjasa (coauthor, 2001) 
 Polska. Historia 1943–2003 (coauthor, 2003)
 Ofiara Sprawiedliwych. Rodzina Ulmów – oddali życie za ratowanie Żydów (coauthor, 2004)
 Stan wojenny w Małopolsce w relacjach świadków (coauthor, 2005)
 Komunizm w Polsce (coauthor, 2005)
 Królowo Polski, przyrzekamy! Jasnogórskie Śluby Narodu Polskiego (coauthor, 2006)
 Zakopiańska Solidarność 1980–1989 (coauthor, 2006).

References

 Biographical note

1963 births
Living people
20th-century Polish historians
Polish male non-fiction writers
Polish male writers
People associated with the Institute of National Remembrance
21st-century Polish historians